Seguenzia richeri is a species of extremely small deep water sea snail, a marine gastropod mollusk in the family Seguenziidae.

Description
The length of the shell attains 3.55 mm. The species has been found 5 times, at sea surface temperatures ranging from 20 to 30 degrees celsius. Two samples have been found at a depth of 1000-2000 meters, and two have been found at 2000-3000 meters, and one has been found at a range of 3000-4000 meters. 2 of the 5 samples were found in 1987, the other three's dates are unknown. The species was named by B. A. Marshall in 1991.

Distribution
This marine species occurs off New Caledonia.

References

External links
 Marshall B.A. (1991). Mollusca Gastropoda : Seguenziidae from New Caledonia and the Loyalty Islands. In A. Crosnier & P. Bouchet (Eds) Résultats des campagnes Musorstom, vol. 7. Mémoires du Muséum National d'Histoire Naturelle, A, 150:41-109
 To Encyclopedia of Life
 To World Register of Marine Species
 https://obis.org/

richeri
Gastropods described in 1991